Ocampo is one of the 67 municipalities of Chihuahua, in north-western Mexico. The municipal seat lies at Ocampo. The municipality covers an area of 2,037.23 km².

As of 2010, the municipality had a total population of 7,546, up from 6,298 as of 2005. 

The municipality had 220 localities, the largest of which (with 2010 population in parentheses) was: Basaseachi (1,248), classified as rural.

Geography

Towns and villages
The municipality has 141 localities. The largest are:

References

Municipalities of Chihuahua (state)

pt:Ocampo